Doclea or Docleia, and also Doklea or Dokleia may refer to:

 Doclea (city), ancient Illyrian, Roman and Byzantine city, near modern Podgorica in Montenegro
 Doclea (state), medieval principality of Duklja, in south-eastern part of modern Montenegro
 Doclean Academy of Sciences and Arts, an academic institution in modern Montenegro
 Doclea (crab), a genus of crabs

See also
 Docleatae
 Dioclea (disambiguation)
 Diocletianopolis (disambiguation)